Lacrosse at the Summer Olympics has been contested at two editions of the Summer Olympic Games, 1904 and 1908. Both times a Canadian team won the competition.  In its first year, two teams from Canada and one team from the United States competed at the games in St. Louis, Missouri. Only two teams, one from Canada and one from Great Britain competed in 1908 in London.

Lacrosse was also held as a demonstration event at the 1928, 1932, and 1948 Summer Olympics. In 1928 and 1932 the United States was represented by the Johns Hopkins Blue Jays men's lacrosse team, and in 1948 by Rensselaer Polytechnic Institute (R.P.I.). Canada sent an all-star team in 1928 and 1932; Great Britain sent an all-star team in 1928 and 1948.

The International Olympic Committee granted provisional status to World Lacrosse in 2018 and Lacrosse may be included in the 2028 Summer Olympics.

Event
• = official event, (d) = demonstration event

Medal table

Every team that has played lacrosse has won a medal.  Canada has won three of the five medals, by virtue of having had three of the five competing teams.

Participating nations
1904
 (two teams)

1908

1928 (demonstration)

1932 (demonstration)

1948 (demonstration)

See also
List of Olympic venues in discontinued events
World Lacrosse
World Lacrosse Championship

References

External links
 

 
Discontinued sports at the Summer Olympics